Javeria Rauf (جواریہ راوُف) (born 10 April 1989) is a Pakistani  cricketer who plays as a right-handed batter and right-arm fast-medium bowler for Pakistan. She has also played domestic cricket for Sindh, Karachi, Omar Associates, Zarai Taraqiati Bank Limited, Saif Sports Saga and State Bank of Pakistan.

She was included in Pakistan's squad for 2013 Women's Cricket World Cup. In April 2019, after last appearing in a Women's One Day International (WODI) match for Pakistan in 2014, she was named in the squad for the series against South Africa. In June 2021, she was named in Pakistan's squad for their series against the West Indies.

References

External links
 
 

1989 births
Rauf, Javeria
Sportspeople from Sindh
Pakistani women cricketers
Pakistan women One Day International cricketers
Pakistan women Twenty20 International cricketers
Sindh women cricketers
Karachi women cricketers
Omar Associates women cricketers
Zarai Taraqiati Bank Limited women cricketers
Saif Sports Saga women cricketers
State Bank of Pakistan women cricketers